The following sortable table comprises the 23 ultra-prominent summits of Central America.  Each of these peaks has at least  of topographic prominence.  This article defines Central America as the seven nations of Belize, Costa Rica, El Salvador, Guatemala, Honduras, Nicaragua, and Panamá.

The summit of a mountain or hill may be measured in three principal ways:
The topographic elevation of a summit measures the height of the summit above a geodetic sea level.
The topographic prominence of a summit is a measure of how high the summit rises above its surroundings.
The topographic isolation (or radius of dominance) of a summit measures how far the summit lies from its nearest point of equal elevation.





Ultra-prominent summits

Of these 23 ultra-prominent summits of Central America, eight are located in Honduras, six in Guatemala, four in El Salvador, three in Costa Rica, two in Nicaragua, and one in Panamá.  Cerro El Pital straddles the border between El Salvador and Honduras.

Gallery

See also

List of mountain peaks of North America
List of mountain peaks of Greenland
List of mountain peaks of Canada
List of mountain peaks of the Rocky Mountains
List of mountain peaks of the United States
List of mountain peaks of México
List of mountain peaks of Central America

List of extreme summits of Central America
List of mountain peaks of the Caribbean
Central America
Geography of Central America
Geology of Central America
:Category:Mountains of Central America
commons:Category:Mountains of Central America
Physical geography
Topography
Topographic elevation
Topographic prominence
Topographic isolation

Notes

References

External links

Bivouac.com
Peakbagger.com
Peaklist.org
Peakware.com
Summitpost.org

Mountains of Central America
Geography of Central America

Central America-related lists
Central America, List Of The Ultra-Prominent Summits Of
Central America